1, 2, 3 Soleils (1, 2, 3 Suns) is a live album performed by Algerian artists Rachid Taha, Khaled and Faudel, widely hailed as the three masters of raï music. The concert, a unique event, took place in 1998 in Palais Omnisports de Paris-Bercy in Paris, and the songs consisted of the most famous from all three artists plus a few Algerian classics. All 23 were divided into two discs, produced and arranged by Steve Hillage, released by Barclay in 1999.

The album has attained 2× gold certification and the DVD video has attained gold certification from Syndicat National de l'Edition Phonographique.

A shortened US one compact disc release of the album was released by Ark 21.

Track listing

Professional rating
Allmusic rated it 4 out of 5.

Personnel
Khaled, Faudel and Rachid Taha were supported by:

 Zachary Alford - drums 
 Aziz Ben Salam - ney flute 
 Elsa Benabdallah - violin 
 Mohamed Bendjebour - guitar 
 Djaffar Bensetti - trumpet 
 Farhat Bouallagui - arranger, string arrangements, violin 
 Christophe Briquet - viola 
 Karen Brunon - leader, string director, violin 
 Mathieu Chédid - guitar 
 Mohsein Chentouf - bendir, darbouka, backing vocals
 Simon Clarke - baritone saxophone
 Khaled Dagher - cello 
 Gail Ann Dorsey - bass, backing vocals
 Adel Eskande - violin 
 Guillaume Fontanarosa - violin 
 Steve Hillage - arranger, engineer, mixing, producer, string arrangements 
 Allen Hoist - alto and tenor saxophone
 Hazem Ibrahim - violin 
 Randy Jacobs - guitar 
 Nabil Khalidi - banjo, oud, backing vocals
 Hassan Lachal - darbouka 
 Sylvain Le Provost - double bass 
 Roddy Lorimer - trumpet 
 Abdel Wahab Mansy - violin 
 Jean-Max Mery - keyboards 
 Christophe Morin - cello 
 Hossam Ramzy - director, orchestra director, percussion 
 Geoffrey Richardson - string arrangements, viola 
 Medhat Abdel Samie - violin 
 Tim Sanders - soprano and tenor saxophone
 Mahmoud Serour - string arrangements 
 Mark London Sims - trombone 
 Taha Taha - cello 
 Yasser Taha - cello 
 Ihab Tutu - violin 
 Marylene Vinciguerra - viola 
 Tamer Yassin - violin

Source:

References

External links
 1, 2, 3 Soleils album

Khaled (musician) live albums
Rachid Taha live albums
Faudel live albums
Albums produced by Steve Hillage
1999 live albums
Arabic-language live albums
Ark 21 Records live albums
1999 video albums
Barclay (record label) live albums
Barclay (record label) video albums
Live video albums
Arabic-language video albums
Faudel video albums
Rachid Taha video albums
Khaled (musician) video albums